Hypercompe ocularia, the ocularia leopard, is a moth of the family Erebidae. The species was first described by Johan Christian Fabricius in 1775.

Description

This moth is a translucent-white colour, patterned with numerous brown, oval rings on the forewings.

Distribution
It is found in Colombia, Peru and Ecuador. This is a cloud-forest species found at elevations between about 200–1000 m.

Biology
Moths of the genus Hypercompe are noxious to birds and exhibit warning colouration. When approached by a bird, these moths expose a coloured abdomen and exude noxious fluids as a defence mechanism.

References

Hypercompe
Moths described in 1775
Taxa named by Johan Christian Fabricius